Gisund Bridge is a cantilever road bridge on Norwegian County Road 86 in Senja Municipality in Troms og Finnmark county, Norway. The bridge crosses the Gisundet strait from the town of Finnsnes on the mainland to the village of Silsand on the island of Senja. Gisund Bridge was opened on 23 June 1972.

See also
List of bridges in Norway
List of bridges in Norway by length
List of bridges
List of bridges by length

References

External links

A picture of the bridge

Bridges completed in 1972
Lenvik
Road bridges in Troms og Finnmark
1972 establishments in Norway
Senja